Eudihammus granulatus is a species of beetle in the family Cerambycidae, and the only species in the genus Eudihammus. It was described by Gahan in 1906.

References

Lamiini
Beetles described in 1906